This is a list of films which have been placed number-one at the South Korean box office during 2006, based on admissions.

Highest-grossing films

References

See also 
 Lists of South Korean films

South Korea
2006 in South Korean cinema
2006